Amoaba plumosa is a species of beetle in the family Cerambycidae, the only species in the genus Amoaba.

References

Heteropsini